Tan Sri Dato' Seri Utama Dr. Rais bin Yatim (Jawi: رئيس بن يتيم; born 16 April 1942) is a Malaysian politician who is now serving as the 18th President of the Dewan Negara since September 2020. He was a Cabinet Minister in multiple federal governments from 1974 to 2013 and the 8th Menteri Besar of Negeri Sembilan from 1978 to 1982.  He was the Member of Parliament (MP) for Jelebu from November 1999 to May 2013.

He was a member of the United Malays National Organisation (UMNO), the leading party in previous ruling Barisan Nasional (BN) coalition, except for a period in the 1990s when he became a member of the opposition Parti Melayu Semangat 46 (S46). Presently he is a member of Malaysian United Indigenous Party (BERSATU) and its Chairman of the state of Negeri Sembilan, a component party of the ruling Perikatan Nasional (PN) since he left UMNO to join BERSATU on 4 June 2018.

During his short break from active politics before joining BERSATU, he became the President of the International Islamic University Malaysia (IIUM) from 2013 to 2018.

Early life and education
Rais was born to a Minangkabau immigrant family of Muhammad Yatim and Siandam in Kampung Gagu, Jelebu, Negeri Sembilan. Rais has four siblings, namely Naam, Suri and Atan. 

He graduated from Language Institute (also known as Language Teaching College), Kuala Lumpur in 1964. Rais through early education Standard I and II at Sekolah Melayu Triang (now Sekolah Kebangsaan Teriang), then move on to the School of Malay Gagu and Government English School, Taipei, Kuala Klawang. While at GES, Rais's writing skills using elements of art and beautiful languages as well as his interest in reading began to take shape, which became the identity to his current writing and speaking style. He was exposed to Shakespeare’s dialogues especially King Henry V, Hamlet, Midsummer Night Dream, Romeo and Juliet and others.

After graduating from the Cambridge Senior School Certificate (CSC), Rais worked as a temporary teacher at Sekolah Kebangsaan Astana Raja, in Rembau. In 1963, Rais was accepted into the Language Teaching College (LI) as a trainee teacher for 2 years. While at LI, in addition to his duties as a trainee teacher, Rais produced many articles published by Utusan Zaman, Dewan Masharakat, Mastika and Dewan Bahasa. Rais enrolled at Stamford Collage and later went on to study Law at the University of Singapore. 

At the University of Singapore, among the figures who became his lecturers were Ramachandran Naidu (former court interpreter in Kuala Lumpur), Sulaiman Abdullah (well - known lawyer) and Dr. Chandra Muzaffar (former Vice President of PKR). Rais was very active in participating in debate and speech competitions at the University of Singapore and often met Chandra in the competition. He won the Beasley Shield Award for the general speech category, while Chandra won the debate competition.

A lawyer by profession later, he received his Bachelor of Laws LL.B (Hons.) In 1973 and obtained an A mark in the paper “Comparative Law” which refined on the comparison of Adat Perpatih with Common Law.

Early career
In 1973 he became a lawyer and solicitor in the Kuala Lumpur High Court and then in 1998 became a lawyer in Singapore. In the same year, Rais set up the law firm of Ram Rais & Yap. 

In 1965 to 1968, he taught Bahasa Malaysia to the American Peace Corps in the United States. Upon his return from the US, Rais taught English, History, Science and Drawing at Undang Luak Jelebu Secondary School and then in 1967, he was assigned to Bandar Tinggi Secondary School.
 
Rais also worked as a translator at Dewan Bahasa dan Pustaka (DBP) in 1971 besides being a part-time lecturer in Commercial Law at Institut Teknologi Mara (now UiTM).

He subsequently obtained a doctorate (Ph.D) in law from King’s College University of London in 1994 and his thesis was Rule Of Law and Executive Supremacy in Malaysia. His doctoral dissertation was eventually published in 1995 as Freedom Under Executive Power in Malaysia: A Study of Executive Supremacy.

Political career
Rais has held various positions in the national cabinet and other state government positions. He had been appointed a Minister in the Prime Minister's Department, Menteri Besar of Negeri Sembilan (1978–1982), Minister of Land and Regional Development (1982–1984), Minister of Information (1984–1986) and Foreign Minister (1986–1987).

When he fell out of favour of the UMNO leadership in April 1987, he became the deputy leader of the opposition Parti Melayu Semangat 46 (S46 or Semangat 46), a breakaway party formed by Tengku Razaleigh Hamzah and UMNO members dissatisfied with Mahathir Mohamad's leadership. During that times he also he resumed his law career and worked with a firm, Ram, Rais & Partner, from 1987 to 1999. Like most Semangat 46 leaders, after the party was dissolved in 1996, he rejoined UMNO by the end of the decade. Upon his return to the ministry in 1999, as Minister in the Prime Minister's Department, he was effusive in his praise for Mahathir, who had outlasted the Semangat 46 movement with successive election victories. He held the ministry until the 2004 election, after which Abdullah Badawi, who had replaced Mahathir on his retirement, appointed him as Minister of Culture, Arts and Heritage.

In June 2007, Rais was nominated as a candidate for the post of the next Commonwealth Secretary-General after Don McKinnon's term in office ended in March 2008. However, he pulled out on 26 July, citing the lateness of campaigning, and his duties and commitments as the Main Committee of the upcoming 50th Merdeka celebrations, which limited him from travelling out of the country to lobby for his candidacy.

Rais served another term as Foreign Minister from 18 March 2008 until 9 April 2009, when the incoming Prime Minister Najib Razak appointed him as the Minister for Information, Communications and Culture. He remained in that ministry until the 2013 election, when he was dropped as a parliamentary candidate. Speaking generally about Barisan Nasional's decision to drop a number of senior figures from its parliamentary lineup, Najib stated that it was to "satisfy the demands of voters who want to see Barisan Nasional and UMNO change and reform". Rais accepted the decision and called on fellow UMNO members to remain loyal to the party. Within a few months he was appointed as the President of the International Islamic University of Malaysia. 

On 16 June 2020, he was appointed as a senator in the Dewan Negara by the Yang di-Pertuan Agong after he join BERSATU in June 2018 and return to active politics.

Personal life
He is married to Masnah Rais. The couple has four children, namely Malini Rais, Dino Rais, Danni Rais and Ronni Rais. During his childhood and adolescence, Rais interacted a lot with the local Chinese community. This enabled him to speak Cantonese (the main Chinese language spoken throughout Negeri Sembilan) fluently, in addition to his native Negeri Sembilan Minangkabau, Standard Malay and English. His hobbies are photography and travelling and arts-culture. Apart from being highly skilled in photography, Rais is also talented in drawing. He obtained an A mark in the Higher School Certificate (HSC) examination. Rais even produced a large mural for Dunearn Road Hostel at the University of Singapore and the mural is still on display at Shears Hall Great Hall in Kent Ridge.

Election results

Honours

Honours of Malaysia
  :
  Commander of the Order of Loyalty to the Crown of Malaysia (PSM) – Tan Sri (2013)
  :
  Knight Grand Commander of the Order of the Life of the Crown of Kelantan (SJMK) – Dato' (2002)
  :
  Knight Grand Commander of the Order of the Crown of Perlis (SPMP) – Dato' Seri (2010)
  :
  Grand Knight of the Order of Sultan Ahmad Shah of Pahang (SSAP) – Dato' Sri (2005)
  :
  Knight Companion of the Order of Loyalty to Negeri Sembilan (DSNS) – Dato' (1979)
  Knight Grand Commander of the Order of Loyalty to Negeri Sembilan (SPNS) – Dato' Seri Utama (2001)
  :
  Grand Commander of the Order of Kinabalu (SPDK) – Datuk Seri Panglima (2010)

Books
Rais is also an author and has written extensively on the subject of law, politics and the community where a total of 19 books have been produced by him to date.
 Pola-Pola Antropologi, Dewan Bahasa Pustaka, Kuala Lumpur, 1973 (Translation).
 The Hierarchy of Adat Perpatih in Negeri Sembilan (1974).
 Faces in the Corridors of Power – A Pictorial Depiction of Malaysians in Position of Power Pelanduk Publications, Lumpur (1987)
 Freedom Under Executive Power in Malaysia, Endowment Publications, Kuala 	Lumpur (1995)
 Zaman Beredar Pusaka Bergilir (2000).
 Jelebak-Jelebu : Corat-Coret Anak Kampung, Dawama Kuala Lumpur 2004.
 Cabinet Governing in Malaysia, (2006), Dawama, Kuala Lumpur
 Perjuangan Pri-Bumi (2009).
 Perjuangan Asas Bangsa (2009).
 Kabinet 1Malaysia: Mengimbas Kembali Tadbir Urus Kabinet (2011).
 1Malaysia Cabinet: Reflecting on Cabinet Governing (2011).
 King Ghaz: A Man of His Time (Ed.) 2011.
 Tunku: Still the Greatest Malaysian (Ed.) 2012.
 Pantun & Bahasa Indah: Jendela Budaya Melayu (2013).
 Meniti Badai Perjuangan (2013).
 Adat: The Legacy of Minangkabau (2015).
 Antara Cakap dan Fikir (2019).
 Peribahasa Melayu-Cina (2020).
 Budi Asas Tamadun (2021).

See also
List of people who have served in both Houses of the Malaysian Parliament

References

External links

 
 

1942 births
Living people
People from Negeri Sembilan
Malaysian people of Minangkabau descent
Malaysian people of Malay descent
Malaysian Muslims

20th-century Malaysian lawyers

Malaysian United Indigenous Party politicians
Former United Malays National Organisation politicians
Parti Melayu Semangat 46 politicians
Chief Ministers of Negeri Sembilan
Negeri Sembilan state executive councillors
Members of the Negeri Sembilan State Legislative Assembly
Culture ministers of Malaysia
Foreign ministers of Malaysia
Information ministers of Malaysia
Land ministers of Malaysia
Government ministers of Malaysia
Members of the Dewan Rakyat
Presidents of the Dewan Negara
Members of the Dewan  Negara
Alumni of King's College London
Grand Commanders of the Order of Kinabalu
21st-century Malaysian politicians